Raviswarapuram Siva Temple is an ancient Hindu temple dedicated to Shiva at Kodungalloor of Thrissur District in Kerala state in India. The presiding deity of the temple is Lord Shiva in Raviswara form, located in main Sanctum Sanctorum, facing East. The existence of temple was mentioned in Sangam Literature as one of the major temples under Chera Dynasty. According to folklore, sage Parashurama has installed the idol. It is the part of the 108 Shiva temples of Kerala.

See also
 108 Shiva Temples
 Temples of Kerala
 Hindu temples in Thrissur Rural

References

108 Shiva Temples
Shiva temples in Kerala
Hindu temples in Thrissur